Sergei Prokofiev's Piano Sonata No. 1 in F minor, Op. 1 was written in 1909. It consists of a single movement in sonata form.

Movements (sub-movements)
Allegro - Meno mosso - Piu mosso - Meno mosso

External links

Prokofiev Piano Sonata No 1 in F minor, Opus 1 (1908).
Video - Prokofiev Piano Sonata No 1/score (08:04).

Compositions by Sergei Prokofiev
Piano sonatas by Sergei Prokofiev
20th-century classical music
1908 compositions
Compositions in F minor
Piano compositions in the 20th century